The Kentucky Channel, also known by its Program and System Information Protocol short name and on-screen logo bug as KET KY, is a full-time 24/7 statewide digital television programming service originating from PBS member state-network Kentucky Educational Television. The channel features programming related to the U.S. state of Kentucky (with some programming relevant to surrounding states such as Tennessee, Indiana or Virginia), as well as coverage of Kentucky General Assembly when it is in session.

It is carried on the third digital subchannel of all fifteen (15) of KET's main satellite stations, and on the second digital subchannel of Louisville-based KET2 station WKMJ-TV. The channel is programmed and broadcast from the O. Leonard Press Telecommunications Center at 600 Cooper Drive in Lexington, Kentucky.

History

KET Star Channels
KET's Star Channels 703 and 704, the network's interactive distance learning services that were launched in 1988, predated the advent of digital over-the-air television broadcasting of any kind by eleven years, and they were only available to schools and libraries throughout the state through satellite technology. Public schools were outfitted with satellite dishes and keypads, provided by NTN Communications, to provide two-way communications between the instructors at the KET studios in Lexington and students throughout the state; all public schools in Kentucky were outfitted with the technology by the end of 1989. This interactive service was inspired by a football player predictor game at a local sports bar in Lexington. The services were so successful in education centers, that the network earned the Innovations Award from the Ford Foundation for the star channels in 1991. Sometime around 1993-94, the Star Channels were repurposed as direct broadcast satellite television services available to C-band free-to-air satellite systems. Star Channel 703 provided PK-12 educational programming exclusively to public schools and libraries throughout the state, plus several other states. Star Channel 704 provided Annenberg/CPB Project programming, including college-credit telecourses and professional development series.

As KET3
In early 2002, the statewide relaunch of KET2 through the facilities of WKMJ-TV in Louisville, along with two new digital services, KET3 and KET4, were launched over the air as multicast services that were made available through the digital signals of all fifteen principal KET satellites. Initially, KET3 began broadcasting as a locally programmed 24/7 PBS Kids channel programmed by KET, while KET4 began as a PBS digital sampler channel. KET's second, third, and fourth subchannels, which were launched in May 2002, were the first ever digital subchannels in most, if not all, of Kentucky's media market's (e.g. Paducah, Evansville (Indiana), Bowling Green, Louisville, Cincinnati (Ohio), Lexington, and Huntington (West Virginia) markets), as most commercial outlets typically never began to launch digital signals or multicast services until the mid-2000s. 

Beginning in August 2002, KET3 and KET4 were repurposed to become over-the-air relaunches of Star Channels 703 and 704 as both the then-new third and fourth subchannels began simulcasting the two respective channels, making them available to tens of thousands of homes via the digital over-the-air signals and on cable television systems for the first time. This has provided a benefit to parents and teachers of home-schooled children and parochial schools (i.e. Christian and Catholic schools) in addition to teachers and students of public schools, as well as KET viewers that watch lifelong learning-oriented programming. In addition, KET4 also carried PBS HD programming during primetime hours.

Temporary KET-ED simulcast
From August until the end of December 2007, the network's subchannels went through a major realignment phase. Beginning in August 2007, the KET3 and KET4 services were merged to create the Education Channel, KET ED. KET ED and the PBS HD programming block were simulcast on both the DT3 and DT4 subchannels of all 15 of the network's primary transmitters for the remainder of that year.

Birth of The Kentucky Channel
On January 1, 2008, the third subchannel of KET's 15 transmitters began airing a new programming format: a then-new channel devoted to programming about Kentucky people, places, and/or events, in a schedule format similar to that of Twin Cities PBS’s Minnesota Channel. Beginning on January 1, 2008, KET3 was re-branded as the Kentucky Channel, or as identified by the network's voiceover announcer, The Kentucky Channel from KET.

Beginning with the debut of the then-new Kentucky Channel, about 20 hours of Kentucky-related programming was broadcast on the service. Outside of the 20 hours, the service aired the KET HD evening programming service (national PBS HD schedule) in primetime hours from 8 p.m. to 12 Midnight Eastern time (7-11 p.m. Central time), which was previously aired on KET4 outside of that service's 20 hours of Annenberg/CPB channel programming, hence the PSIP readers displaying the channel name as KETKYHD during the 2008-09 television season. The Kentucky Channel also replaced KET5 and KET6, which were discontinued at the end of December 2007, as the part-time service as the official broadcasters of the Kentucky General Assembly. Coverage of both the state House of Representatives and the state Senate is still available in the Frankfort area, overlapping C-SPAN3 and NASA TV on channels 16 and 17, respectively, on the Frankfort Plant Board cable system.

As a full-time service 
Beginning with the 2009-10 television season, the Kentucky Channel expanded to a 24-hour programming schedule after all HD programming schedules began to be handled by the network, and moved onto the flagship service, the main channel of the fifteen principal satellite stations. An increase of fees for the usage of the national PBSHD channel feed caused the network to program PBS HD programming by itself on the main channel. After the KET ED linear service permanently signed off the DT4 subchannels of KET's principal signals and WKMJ-DT3, some of its former programming aired overnights on the Kentucky Channel from 1 to 6 a.m. Eastern (12 midnight to 5 a.m. Central) until that block was discontinued in 2012, making the Kentucky Channel truly full-time. KET ED still existed as an on-demand video service available on the network's website, offering a limited selection of the service's former programming as late as the mid-2010s. 

Also in 2009, the Kentucky Channel began broadcasting over WKMJ-DT2/Louisville; it would move to that station's third subchannel upon its conversion to the ATSC 3.0 (NextGen TV) format in 2022.

Programming 
 
Since the inception of the Kentucky Channel, it has been broadcasting an extensive programming schedule involving dozens of programs and documentaries about Kentucky-related issues, heritage, history, people and culture from KET's vast library of original programming. The channel's programming schedule also includes encore presentations of most of the current lineup of popular local programs, including the most recent episodes of the network's most watched programs, including several reruns of Kentucky Life, including the most recent episodes, along with that program's ever-popular telethon specials that aired from 1998 through the early- and mid-2000s during the network's annual telethons. The channel also airs any PBS program that has any relevancy to Kentucky as well. Original programming from KET's archives broadcast on the Kentucky Channel include several in-house productions of documentaries, including those hosted by several Kentucky authors and media personalities. The channel also airs select archived episodes of original series such as Bywords, Distinguished Kentuckian, Run That By Me Again, and From The Ground Up, among others.

The channel also features programs and films produced by locally based independent production companies and film makers. Some of Kentucky's commercial television stations also produced some programs that would later air on the Kentucky Channel. For instance, in late Spring, and around the 4th of July holiday season, the channel airs some Thunder Over Louisville coverage from that city's local stations such as Fox affiliate WDRB, with the KET rebroadcast of the coverage presented commercial-free. Lexington CBS affiliate WKYT-TV even produced a documentary about former University of Kentucky basketball coach Adolph Rupp that is seldom rebroadcast on the channel as well.

Outside of KET's archives and independent production companies, some documentaries and short programs on the channel are also produced by the mass media divisions of some Kentucky colleges and universities. Following a similar format of public, educational, and/or Government access television stations, in addition to colleges, universities, and independent production companies, some programming is produced by Kentucky-based government agencies and non-profit organizations within the state, who can submit their programs for broadcast on the channel.

Availability 
The Kentucky Channel is broadcast over the third digital subchannel of all of KET's fifteen (15) principal broadcast relay stations, and on the network's ATSC 3.0 station WKMJ-DT3. The channel is also available to several cable television systems throughout and within the state, including Mediacom, Charter/Spectrum, Comcast/Xfinity, Zito Media, and Suddenlink Communications. It is also available on a few dozen locally owned cable companies in the state. A few out-of-state cable television systems also carry the Kentucky Channel, along with the flagship KET service, especially those who are based out-of-state, but also serves certain Kentucky communities along its boundaries, including the cable systems of Cincinnati Bell and the Lafayette, Tennessee-based North Central Telephone Cooperative. Depending on the program, some full episodes and a variety of video clips of KET's original programming (recent or archived) can also be viewed on the network's website.

Affiliates

Current

Former

See also
Kentucky Educational Television
WKMJ-TV

References

External links
Kentucky Educational Television 
KET’s Kentucky Page

 
 
 
 

 

 
 
 
 
 
 

 

Television networks in the United States
English-language television stations in the United States
Kentucky Educational Television
Public television in the United States
Television channels and stations established in 2008
Television stations in Kentucky
2008 establishments in Kentucky